The Tamils Rehabilitation Organisation (TRO) was established in 1985 in Tamil Nadu in southeastern India by Tamil refugees fleeing the violence in North and East Sri Lanka. Its initial operation was to provide relief to the refugees in India. After the signing of the Indo-Sri Lanka Accord and the subsequent fighting between the LTTE and the Indian Peace Keeping Force, TRO moved its operation and headquarters to Jaffna in Northern Sri Lanka.

The headquarters moved again to Killinochchi after Jaffna was taken by Sri Lanka Armed Forces in 1995. After the signing of the ceasefire agreement in 2002 between the LTTE and the Government of Sri Lanka, TRO was recognised by the Government as a legitimate NGO and was granted NGO status. During the period 2002 to 2005 TRO operated from offices across Sri Lanka in both Government and LTTE controlled areas providing post war and post tsunami relief and rehabilitation to Tamil community.

Tamils Rehabilitation Organisation (TRO) received an award on 22 August 2005. The Government of Sri Lanka / President recognized TRO with the award for the construction of post-tsunami transitional shelters. 

On 15 November 2007, the United States Department of the Treasury designated the TRO as a SDGT in the SDN under Executive Order 13224, aimed to financially isolate US designated foreign terrorist groups and their support network. Under this order, the Department of the Treasury froze all assets held by the TRO and its designees in US territories, and formally prohibited US citizens from transacting with the TRO or its members.

The Department of Treasury stated that "T.R.O. passed off its operations as charitable, when in fact it was raising money for a designated terrorist group responsible for heinous acts of terrorism ... in the United States, T.R.O. has raised funds on behalf of the LTTE through a network of individual representatives.  According to sources within the organization, T.R.O. is the preferred conduit of funds from the United States to the LTTE in Sri Lanka".

See also
British Tamil Association
World Tamil Movement
2006 murder of TRO workers in Sri Lanka

References

External links
 TRO Australia
 Tamils Rehabilitation Organisation and the Projects Implemented by it
 International moves to crack down on LTTE’s biggest fund-raising sources
 From relief, rehabilitation to peace

Tamil diaspora in Asia
Overseas Tamil organizations
Refugees in India
Social history of Tamil Nadu

Organisations designated as terrorist by Sri Lanka
India–Sri Lanka relations
Indian Peace Keeping Force
Organizations designated as terrorist by the United States
Specially Designated Nationals and Blocked Persons List